Pronomeuta is a genus of moths of the family Yponomeutidae.

Species
Pronomeuta lemniscata - Meyrick, 1922 
Pronomeuta sarcopis - Meyrick, 1905 

Yponomeutidae